Thadaakam is a 1982 Indian Malayalam-language film directed by I. V. Sasi, starring Ratheesh, Seema, Bheeman Raghu, Mammotty & Balan K Nair.

Cast

Ratheesh as Rajendran
Seema as Sreedevi/Naseeba
Sumalatha as Sabara
Captain Raju as Jabbar Khaan
Balan K. Nair as Gopakumar
Bheeman Raghu as Rahim
Kuthiravattam Pappu as Balan
Sabitha Anand
Surekha as Sulekha
Mammotty as Gabbar Khan

References

External links
 

1980 films
1980s Malayalam-language films
Films with screenplays by T. Damodaran
Films directed by I. V. Sasi
Films scored by A. T. Ummer